The TVG Free For all Championships is a set of harness races for Standardbred horses run annually since 2013 at Meadowlands Racetrack in East Rutherford, New Jersey.

As of 2016 the Championship races consist of the following:
Free For All Mare Pace  - $200,000
Free For All Mares Trot - $200,000
Free For All Trot - $400,000
Free For All Pace - $400,000

References

Recurring sporting events established in 2013
Horse races in New Jersey
Harness racing in the United States
Sports in East Rutherford, New Jersey